The Dingle Peninsula (anglicised as Corkaguiny, the name of the corresponding barony) is the northernmost of the major peninsulas in County Kerry. It ends beyond the town of Dingle at Dunmore Head, the westernmost point of Ireland and arguably Europe.

Name
The Dingle Peninsula is named after the town of Dingle. The peninsula is also commonly called Corca Dhuibhne (Corcu Duibne) even when those referring to it are speaking in English. Corca Dhuibhne, which means "seed or tribe of Duibhne" (a Goddess, a Gaelic clan name), takes its name from the túath (people, nation) of Corco Dhuibhne who occupied the peninsula in the Middle Ages and who also held a number of territories in the south and east of County Kerry.

Geography
The peninsula exists because of the band of sandstone rock that forms the Slieve Mish mountain range at the neck of the peninsula, in the east, and the Brandon Group of mountains, and the Mountains of the Central Dingle Peninsula further to the west. Ireland's highest mountain outside MacGillycuddy's Reeks, Mount Brandon at 951 m, forms part of a high ridge with views over the peninsula and North Kerry.

Conor Pass, which runs from Dingle on the south-western end of the peninsula towards Brandon Bay and Castlegregory in the north-east, is the highest mountain pass in Ireland, a narrow, twisting road; it weaves its way around the sharp cliff faces and past the high corrie lakes.

The Blasket Islands lie off the west coast. They are known for the literary and linguistic heritage of the former inhabitants. However, these remote islands have been uninhabited since the 1950s following an evacuation.

Culture and language
The western end of the peninsula is a Gaeltacht (Irish-speaking area) that has produced a number of nationally notable authors and poets; Pádraig Ó Siochfhradha and Peig Sayers among others. This is the westernmost part of Ireland, and the village of Dún Chaoin is often jokingly referred to as "the next parish to America."

Archaeology
The peninsula is the location of numerous prehistoric and early medieval remains including:
 Glanfahan, site of ancient dry-stone huts (clocháns)
 Caherdorgan North, with medieval stone buildings
 Ballywiheen, containing an ancient stone fort and monastic settlement
 Kilmalkedar, monastic settlement with Ogham stone
 Ferriter's Cove, at the western tip of the peninsula; and
 Gallarus Oratory in the very west of the peninsula near the village of Baile an Fheirtéaraigh in Ard na Caithne.
Músaem Chorca Dhuibhne, situated in the village of Baile an Fheirtéaraigh (Ballyferriter) has exhibitions detailing the archaeology and history of the peninsula. Some of the exhibitions include Ogham stones, artefacts from the excavations at the nearby monastic site of Riasc (Reask) and objects on loan from the National Museum of Ireland.

In April 2021, Irish archaeologists from the National Monuments Service and Ireland's National Museum announced the discovery of an untouched Bronze Age grave, skeletal remains, fragments of human bone and a large semicircular slab in the underground passageway. Archaeologist Mr Ó Coileáin reported: “We think this may have been a ritual site with an element of burial in it and this could be one of those. This looks like it is a chambered tomb from the prehistoric period which might have been a significant marker on the landscape".

Places of interest

The peninsula is known for the MV Ranga, a Spanish cargo vessel that wrecked on the coast in 1982.

Gallaunmore is a standing stone and National Monument.

Rahinnane Castle is a 15th-century castle built on a medieval ringfort.

Slieveglass, an area of high ground near the village of Brandon, was the site of Ireland's first fatal airliner accident. On July 28, 1943, a BOAC Short S.25 Sunderland III, G-AGES, crashed at 2,000 feet while descending into Foynes in fog, killing 10 of the 25 onboard.

In film
David Lean's 1970 film Ryan's Daughter takes place at a village on the Dingle Peninsula in the immediate aftermath of the 1916 Easter Rising, and was partly shot on location near Dún Chaoin, Coumeenole Beach, Slea Head and Inch Strand.  Far and Away, a 1992 film directed by Ron Howard, was partly filmed on the peninsula.

The film Leap Year is partly set in the Dingle Peninsula, but none of the filming took place in the area.

Several local areas were used for filming of Star Wars: The Last Jedi including Dunmore Head and Slea Head where a replica of the Clochán huts of Skellig Michael were built.

In music 

Dingle is mentioned in Phil Colclough and June Colclough's "Song for Ireland."

Gallery

See also
 Beara Peninsula
 Eask tower
 Iveragh Peninsula
 Mount Brandon
 Munster Irish
 Song for Ireland

References

External links
 
 

Peninsulas of County Kerry
Important Bird Areas of the Republic of Ireland